Azure Cove is a cove  long, lying just east of Cangrejo Cove in the southwest part of Flandres Bay, on the northeast coast of Kyiv Peninsula, Graham Land. It was discovered by the Belgian Antarctic Expedition under Gerlache (1897–99) and named Baie d'Azur because when the Belgica anchored near here, everything appeared to be colored blue in the evening light.

References
 

Coves of Graham Land
Danco Coast